Lachgar is a Moroccan surname. Notable people with the surname include:

Driss Lachgar (born 1954), Moroccan politician 
Hasnaa Lachgar (born 1989), Moroccan boxer
Ibtissam Lachgar (born 1975), Moroccan feminist, human rights activist, and LGBT advocate

Surnames of African origin